Norman Ladelle Brown (February 1, 1919 – May 31, 1995) was a professional baseball player. He was a right-handed pitcher over parts of two seasons (1943, 1946) with the Philadelphia Athletics. For his career, he compiled a record of 0–1, with a 3.14 earned run average, and four strikeouts in 14⅓ innings pitched. Between his stints with the A's, Brown served in the United States Army 1944–1945 during World War II, achieving the rank of TEC-5.

References

External links

1919 births
1995 deaths
Philadelphia Athletics players
Major League Baseball pitchers
Baseball players from North Carolina
Canton Terriers players
Rocky Mount Red Sox players
Greensboro Red Sox players
San Diego Padres (minor league) players
Louisville Colonels (minor league) players
Toronto Maple Leafs (International League) players
Atlanta Crackers players
Chattanooga Lookouts players
Birmingham Barons players
Montgomery Grays players
Lincoln Chiefs players
Jacksonville Braves players
United States Army non-commissioned officers
United States Army personnel of World War II